The Eurasian Economic Commission (EEC) is the executive body of the Eurasian Economic Union responsible for implementing decisions, upholding the EEU treaties and managing the day-to-day business of the Eurasian Economic Union. The main task of the Eurasian Economic Commission is to ensure the functioning and development of the EEU, and to prepare proposals for its further integration.

The Board of the Commission operates as a cabinet government, with 10 members of the Commission ("commissioners"). There are two members per member state. The Chairman of the Commission (currently Mikhail Myasnikovich) is nominated by the heads of state of the member states of the EEU. The usual working language of the Commission is Russian.

The EEC was constituted by the Treaty on the Eurasian Economic Commission,  signed on November 18, 2011 and which entered into force on 1 January 2012. It began it operations on February 2, 2012. On 1 January 2015 it became the principle organ of the Eurasian Economic Union, upon entry into force of the Treaty on the Eurasian Economic Union.

History

Establishment
The legal basis for the Eurasian Economic Commission is the Treaty on the Eurasian Economic Commission, which entered into force on 1 January 2012 for Belarus,  Kazakhstan and Russia. The commission started its work 1 month later as an executive body for the Single Economic Space. All the powers of the Customs Union's Commission, which had been established in 2010 are delegated to the commission. With the entry into force of the Treaty on the Eurasian Economic Union, the Commission became the main executive organ of Union.

Enlargement
With the enlargement of the Eurasian Economic Union, more Board and Council Members were appointed. Both Armenia and Kyrgyzstan received one Board member from the moment of their accession to the Union, as well as 3 respectively 2 Council Members. The Council members were however not assigned a specific portfolio, until the next commission is appointed in February 2016.

Governance 
The EEC is a two level body, consisting of:
 Council of the Eurasian Economic Commission (5 members, 1 each from all EEU member states)
 Board of the Eurasian Economic Commission (10 members, 2 each from all EEU member states)

The Council of the Commission 

The Presidency of the Council rotates every year among the deputy prime-ministers of EEC member states. Rotation of the Presidency of the Council is carried out in turn in Russian alphabetical order by name of the Party. The Council's decisions are taken by consensus.

The Board of the Commission 
The executive power of the EEC is held by the Board of the Commission, providing development and implementation of policies for further integration.
The Board of the Commission is composed of 10 commissioners, 2 per member state. One of the commissioners is the Chairman of the Board of the Commission.
The Chairman of the Board of the Commission and Members of the Board of the Commission are appointed for four years with a possible extension of powers by Heads of States.
The decisions of the Board of the Commission are made by " qualified majority voting". Each member of the Board of the Commission has one vote.

Advisory Bodies of the Commission 
The Commission is divided into several departments, and each of which is further divided into sections.

The College of the Commission has overall charge of the departments. Each department is managed by one of the Members of the Board (of Ministers) in accordance with the division of responsibilities between them.

Departments:
Department of Integration Development
Department of Macroeconomic Policy
Department of Statistics
Department of Financial Policy
Department of Entrepreneurial Activity Development
Department of Labor Migration and Social Protection
Department of Industrial Policy
Department of Agro-Industrial Policy
Department of Customs, Tariff, and Non-Tariff Regulation
Department of Internal Market Protection
Department of Trade Policy
Department of Technical Regulation and Accreditation
Department of Sanitary, Phytosanitary, and Veterinary Measures
Department of Customs Legislation and Law Enforcement Practice
Department of Customs Infrastructure
Department of Transport and Infrastructure
Department of Energy
Department of Antimonopoly Regulation
Department of Competition Policy and Policy in the Field of Public Procurement
Department of Information Technology
Department of Internal Market Function
Department of Protocol and Organizational Support
Department of Finance
Legal Department
Department of Managerial Affairs

Employment
From January 1, 2012 the Commission include the administrative body of about 600 international civil servants. From July 1, 2012 the number of employees increased to 850 staff members and from January 1, 2013 – to 1,071. All persons employed by the Commission as officials are international civil servants.

Powers and functions

The Competences of the Eurasian Economic Commission 
The Competences of the Eurasian Economic Commission were originally defined in the Article 3 of the Treaty on the Eurasian Economic Commission dated November 18, 2010. All the powers of the Customs Union's Commission have been delegated to the Eurasian Economic Commission. The present competences of the commission are defined in the Treaty on the Eurasian Economic Union.

The Competences of the Commission include

customs tariff and non-tariff regulation
customs administration
technical regulation
sanitary, veterinary and phytosanitary measures
enrolment and allocation of import customs duties
establishment of trade regimes with third countries
statistics of external and internal trade
macroeconomic policy
competition policy
industrial and agriculture subsidies
energy policy
natural monopolies
state and municipal procurement
internal trade in services and investment
transport and transportation
currency policy
intellectual property and copyright
migration policy
financial markets (banking, insurance, foreign exchange market, stock market)

The Commission ensures the implementation of international treaties, forming the legal base of the Customs Union (CU) and Single Economic Space (SES). The Commission is also the depositary of international treaties, forming the legal base of the CU and the CES as well as decisions of the Supreme Eurasian Economic Council. Within its competence, the Commission issues non-binding instruments, such as recommendations and also may take decisions that are binding on the Parties.

The budget of the Commission is to be made up of contributions from member states and it is approved by the Supreme Eurasian Economic Council.

See also
Commonwealth of Independent States
Eurasian Economic Union
Eurasianism
Post-Soviet states
Trade blocs

References

External links
Official website of the Eurasian Economic Commission

Eurasian Economic Union
Trade blocs